The 2006 Bahrain Grand Prix (officially the 2006 Formula 1 Gulf Air Bahrain Grand Prix) was a Formula One motor race held at the Bahrain International Circuit in Sakhir, Bahrain on 12 March 2006. The 57-lap race was the opening round of the 2006 Formula One season and the third running of the Bahrain Grand Prix. It was won by the  World Champions, Fernando Alonso and the Renault team. Ferrari driver and polesitter Michael Schumacher began his final season in Formula One (before his return with Mercedes in ) with second position. Kimi Räikkönen completed the podium after he finished in third place with the McLaren team, despite starting in last position.

The race was the first Grand Prix for future world champion Nico Rosberg, son of World Champion Keke Rosberg, who raced with the Williams team. He set the fastest lap of the race and, at the age of 20 years and 258 days, broke the record for the youngest driver to do so, which he held until Max Verstappen scored his first fastest lap, at age 19, at the 2016 Brazilian Grand Prix. It was also the debut race for the BMW Sauber, Toro Rosso, Midland F1 and Super Aguri teams, and drivers Scott Speed and Yuji Ide.

It also saw the début of the 2.4 litre (146.4 cu in) naturally-aspirated V8 engines which were used by all teams except Toro Rosso, who were still using the 3.0 litre (183 cu in) V10 engines that were used from 1995 to 2005, as the team's chassis, the STR1, was reused from the Red Bull RB1 from the 2005 season. This race notably marked the first time teams had fielded V8-powered cars, since the 1997 European Grand Prix.

Report

Practice

Friday drivers
The bottom six teams in the 2005 Constructors' Championship and Super Aguri were entitled to run a third car in free practice on Friday. These drivers drove on Friday but did not compete in qualifying or the race.

Qualifying

The race was the first run under the new 2006 qualifying rules, in which the one-hour session is split into three 'knock out' parts. The first part eliminated Kimi Räikkönen (rear wishbone failure) and Ralf Schumacher, who was caught out by the red flag after Räikkönen's accident and failed to set a competitive time, as well as the MF1's and the two Super Aguris. The second part saw fewer surprises, with the expected runners lining up for the final top 10 part. The result was that the Ferraris swept the front row.

Race
At the start of the race, Fernando Alonso moved up to second in the first lap, only for Michael Schumacher to begin to pull away. Alonso was involved in a near collision with Schumacher's teammate Felipe Massa, who spun at the first corner. Massa was never a threat after this point, not helped by a delay in his pit stop to change tyres the same lap. Alonso's teammate Giancarlo Fisichella also played little part in the race due to an engine mapping problem which restricted power. He retired on the 21st lap due to hydraulic failure. A live team radio broadcast in which the team informed him that he would have to cope with the engine as well as he could led to Fisichella swearing in response; this incident resulted in future team radio broadcasts being time-delayed. To the surprise of few, Kimi Räikkönen quickly moved his way up the field, only being delayed by Jacques Villeneuve and Fisichella for a short period of time, before passing both men.

Further down the field, Nick Heidfeld and Nico Rosberg, who was making his Grand Prix début, touched at the first corner. Both men were significantly delayed, but recovered. Heidfeld's day continued to get worse, as an incident with David Coulthard was investigated after the race.

Juan Pablo Montoya finished 5th in his McLaren, having never been a threat throughout the race. It was a good day for Williams on a whole, as Mark Webber finished in 6th, while Rosberg was the surprise of the race though, ending up a very respectable 7th, passing Christian Klien after catching him in the last few laps of the race, putting Klien down to a still impressive 8th. Rosberg set the fastest lap of the race, becoming the youngest driver ever to achieve this in a Grand Prix, breaking a record held by Alonso.

Honda suffered mixed fortunes throughout the race. Early on fans were treated to a fight between Rubens Barrichello and Jenson Button, as Button slipped down the order due to a slow getaway. Button eventually fought his way back up, twice passing Juan Pablo Montoya at the end of the straight but losing out again in pitstops. He eventually finished 4th, 0.6 seconds behind Räikkönen in 3rd. Räikkönen fought hard throughout the race, stopping only once on his way to the last podium spot. He rose 19 places in the race which is more than any driver since Fabrizio Barbazza started 25th and finished sixth in the 1993 San Marino Grand Prix.

At the second set of pit stops, Alonso was able to take advantage of staying out longer than Schumacher by coming out of the pit lane side by side with Schumacher. As they came into the first corner both cars were neck and neck, but Alonso was able to pull out in front of the former world champion. Despite coming under heavy pressure from Schumacher towards the end, the reigning champion started off the season with a well earned victory.

After a tussle with David Coulthard, Nick Heidfeld was reprimanded by stewards post-race for positioning his car in a way that forced Coulthard off the race circuit. Coulthard suffered engine failure on cool-down lap and received a 10-place grid penalty for 2006 Malaysian Grand Prix.

This was the first race for the Midland, BMW Sauber, Toro Rosso, Honda F1 and Super Aguri teams, although only Super Aguri was a completely new team, the others all representing buyouts or rebrandings of existing teams. Along with Rosberg, Scott Speed and Yuji Ide were also making their Grand Prix débuts.

Classification

Qualifying

Notes
 — Kimi Räikkönen suffered a right rear suspension failure during his first timed lap. The suspension failure, which was due to a manufacturing fault, red flagged the session and ended Räikkönen's qualifying session.
 — Tiago Monteiro suffered transmission failure on the way to the grid, so swapped to the T-car and started from the pitlane.

Race

Championship standings after the race

Drivers' Championship standings

Constructors' Championship standings

 Note: Only the top five positions are included for both sets of standings.

References

External links

 Detailed Bahrain Grand Prix results (archived)

Bahrain Grand Prix
Bahrain Grand Prix
Grand Prix
Bahrain Grand Prix